Guicheng Subdistrict is a subdistrict of the Nanhai District, Foshan, Guangdong, China covering an area of . The subdistrict has a registered population of 186,000 and floating population of 280,000 and is the location of the Nanhai District Government, as well as being the political, economic and cultural centre of Nanhai.

References

External links

Official website of Guicheng Subdistrict, Foshan

Nanhai District
Township-level divisions of Guangdong
Subdistricts of the People's Republic of China